NASSR or Nassr may refer to:

 Ninjas & Superspies Revised
 North American Society for the Study of Romanticism

See also
 Nasr (disambiguation)
 Nasser (disambiguation)